Bill Scott was a college men's basketball coach and athletics administrator. He was the head coach of Hardin–Simmons from 1951 to 1962. He coached Hardin–Simmons to a 129-161 record, winning one Border Intercollegiate Athletic Association championship and two NCAA tournament appearances.  He was inducted into the Hardin–Simmons athletics Hall of Fame in 1982.

Head coaching record

References

Date of birth unknown
Date of death unknown
American men's basketball coaches
College golf coaches in the United States
Hardin–Simmons Cowboys basketball coaches
Hardin–Simmons Cowboys basketball players
Hardin–Simmons Cowboys football players
American men's basketball players